The Challenger Ciudad de Guayaquil is a tennis tournament held in Guayaquil, Ecuador since 2005. The event is part of the ''challenger tour and is played on outdoor clay courts.

Past finals

Singles

Doubles

External links 
Official website
ITF search

 
ATP Challenger Tour
Recurring sporting events established in 2005